The Constitution Review Group was a group established by the Irish government in 1995 to review the Constitution of Ireland and to recommend alterations. The group was chaired by T. K. Whitaker and had fifteen members selected from different backgrounds, though lawyers predominated.

The terms of reference for the Group were:

...to review the Constitution, and in the light of this review, to establish those areas where constitutional change may be desirable or necessary, with a view to assisting the All-Party Oireachtas Committee on the Constitution, to be established by the Oireachtas, in its work.

The Group was excused by its terms of reference from considering Articles 2 and 3 of the Constitution of Ireland and matters relating to cabinet confidentiality.

The Report of the Constitution Review Group was published in July 1996 and ran to 700 pages. This is said to be the most thorough analysis of the Constitution of Ireland ever made.

References

Politics of Ireland
Constitution of Ireland